Fallen is the first novel in the Fallen series written by Lauren Kate. It is a young adult, fantasy, paranormal romance published in 2009 under Delacorte Press. The novel revolves around a young girl named Lucinda "Luce" Price who is sent to Sword & Cross Reform School in Savannah, Georgia, after she is accused of murdering a boy by starting a fire. At the reform school, she meets Daniel, a handsome boy whom she feels inexplicably drawn to, and believes that she has already met before. The book revolves mostly around the concept of religion, fallen angels and reincarnation.

Fallen is the first in a series of six books, which have sold more than 10 million copies worldwide in more than 30 countries. The novel has been translated into more than 30 languages and has more than 80 cover editions. On December 27, 2009, Fallen reached number 3 on The New York Times Best Seller list. It was also a USA Today Bestseller, an Indie Bestseller, and a Publishers Weekly Flying Start. It has been made into a feature-length film of the same name under Lotus Entertainment which was released in November 2016.

Plot
Luce is sent to 'Sword and Cross', a reform school for young adults, after she is blamed for the death of Trevor, a boy that Luce once had a small crush on. It is revealed that, although Luce cannot remember what happened exactly, she remembers kissing Trevor at her previous school's summer camp, Dover. After the kiss, Trevor is said to have spontaneously combusted, which leaves her with burned hair. Luce believes herself to be innocent, which angers her disbelieving peers.

Upon arriving at her new school, Luce encounters a fearsome Randy and shy boy Todd, along with Gabbe, a pretty blonde-haired girl; and Cameron, an attractive looking boy whose second time being sent to Sword and Cross. Cam offers to take Luce to her dorm room, but is abruptly interrupted by Arriane Alter, a self-described psychopath with long black hair. Arriane takes Luce under her wing, which agitates Cam.

Arriane takes Luce to the outside grounds of the school, and demands that Luce cut her hair in the same style as her own. While working on Arriane's hair, Luce notices a scar on her friend's neck, and a shock band on her wrist. She tells Luce that she will not ask questions of her past, as long as Luce makes the same promise, which she does.

After Arriane shows Luce around the school, they both head off to their first lesson of the day. As both are waiting outside the classroom, Luce notices a tall, handsome boy across the grounds, and suddenly becomes nervous and panicky, which she doesn't understand. She also feels as if she knows him from somewhere, but cannot think of where. Arriane says his name is Daniel Grigori, and teases her for staring, embarrassing Luce. Standing next to Daniel is Roland Sparks, a boy with dreadlocks. Daniel notices Luce staring at him, and begins to smile back at her before raising his middle finger at her in an aggressive gesture. Luce is shocked and confused at this, but sees him watch her as she leaves for her class.

Cam meets Luce again in the classroom, and makes further attempts to flirt with Luce. She continues to stress herself out over her encounter with Daniel, which distracts her throughout much of the lesson. After class is over, Luce and Arriane go to the cafeteria for lunch. Luce explains that she is a vegetarian, simply because she does not like the taste of meat. She also notices Daniel in the cafeteria. Losing her nerve, Luce falls backwards, tumbling into Molly Zane, an angry-looking, heavily pierced girl. This angers Molly, and she digs the high-heel of her shoe into Luce's foot before provoking Arriane into a fight. Arriane's shock band on her wrist goes off, causing her to convulse violently, scaring Luce. Randy breaks up the fight, and gives Luce, Arriane and Molly a detention in the school cemetery for the following day. When Randy and Arriane leave, Molly dumps her tray of meatloaf over Luce, and is taunted, all whilst Daniel stares and shakes his head at the whole scene. Luce runs to the bathroom, crying.

There, she meets Penn, the daughter of the school's deceased groundskeeper who explains that she chooses to stay at the school because she has nowhere else to go. Penn befriends Luce, and helps clean the meatloaf out of Luce's hair. The two instantly bond, and it is revealed that Penn can access anybody's personal records held by the school, telling Luce that she is a "...very powerful friend to have."

That evening, Luce visits the library, where she meets Miss Sophia, a grey-haired librarian. As Luce wanders through the maze-like library, she begins to see the return of "The Shadows," paranormal, ink-like smudges that Luce has been seeing since childhood. She then sees Daniel sitting by a window with a sketchbook and approaches him. Daniel is rude to her again, and they accidentally touch, causing a static shock. Both look at each other before Daniel quickly leaves.

The next day, Luce is late for her detention at the cemetery, annoying the rest of the group which consists of Arriane, Molly, Roland, and—much to Luce's surprise—Daniel. The group members are instructed to pair off and clean the cemetery statues. Luce and Arriane start to clean a statue of an "avenging angel," but Arriane runs off after Luce reveals her secret. Molly, after catching Luce staring at Daniel, warns her to stay away from him. Daniel then approaches Luce after "hearing" his name and asks Luce what Molly said. Then the statue breaks and starts falling towards them. Daniel saves Luce from the falling statue, and makes a swift exit.

Later, Luce is invited to Cam's party, which he does loudly in front of Daniel, signalling some sort of rivalry between the two. Before the party, the students of Sword and Cross are encouraged to watch a film as part of a social practice. Here, Luce encounters another Shadow, which she manages to "pinch" out of her pocket. This scares and also excites Luce, as she has never physically interacted with the Shadows before.

At the party, Cam greets Luce warmly. Luce begins to develops a crush on Cam, but this is hindered by her constant feeling of an unusual connection with Daniel. Later, Luce overhears Daniel and Gabbe suggestively whispering to each other outside, leading Luce to believe that they are in a relationship and making her jealous.

The next day, Luce is forced to attend a fitness exam in the gymnasium, which is actually situated in an old church on the school grounds. After Luce loses a swimming race, she sees Daniel in one of the gym rooms, but is aggressively pushed by one of the Shadows before she can approach him. This terrifies Luce, but she eventually goes to Daniel. They awkwardly converse, and Luce tells Daniel that she swears that she knows him from somewhere; Daniel tells her coldly that she does not.

Afterwards, Luce and Cam have a picnic in the cemetery. Cam is about to kiss Luce as Gabbe interrupts, telling Luce she's late for a class. This fuels Luce's hatred towards Gabbe. In the library, Luce is given an assignment to trace her family tree, but searches for Daniel's instead of her own. Penn later tells Luce that she has noticed her doing this, and offers Luce a look at his personal records. She accepts, and discovers that Daniel was sent to Sword and Cross for jaywalking and petty vandalism.

On Luce's first Saturday at Sword and Cross, she is hit in the head by a soccer ball. Daniel seems concerned, and takes Luce to cool down outside. Luce confronts Daniel about Gabbe, to which he confirms that he is not in a relationship with Gabbe. This simultaneously relieves and embarrasses Luce for being so upfront about the situation.

Daniel takes Luce to a hidden-away lake area, where they both swim together before resting on a nearby rock. Here, Daniel warns Luce that he cannot get involved with her romantically as he has been previously "burned" by somebody else. He leaves Luce at the rock, and Luce is confused when she thinks she sees a pair of faint wings on Daniel's back as he runs off.

Back in the library, Luce bonds with Miss Sophia. During one of her classes on ancient angelic myths, Molly taunts Luce, and makes a connection between the name "Lucifer" and "Luce", angering Luce. At the end of the lesson, Daniel asks Luce if she found the lesson interesting, as the stories have always been in his family. Luce tells Daniel that she is surprised he had a family, which Daniel is angered by, scolding her of presuming things about him. On Daniel's private records, it had claimed that Daniel had spent most of his life in an orphanage.

Penn later discovers a book in the library called The Watchers written "D. Grigori". Cam also gives Luce a necklace, which makes her question herself further as to whom she is drawn to more.

In the library, a fire breaks out after Luce witnesses more Shadows. With her in library is Todd, who flees with Luce. Unable to make it out of the smoke, Luce experiences an apparent out-of-body experience, where she can feel herself literally flying out of the smoke and into fresh air. Another Shadow attacks her and Todd, and Luce blacks out.

Luce wakes up in the hospital the next day, and is pampered by Gabbe, Penn, and Arriane. Gabbe then tells Luce that it was Daniel that carried her out of the fire, but Todd was killed after breaking his neck trying to escape. Luce spots Daniel waiting outside her room with a worried face, some peonies, and mouths, "I'm sorry," to her.

Two days later, a memorial service for Todd is held at Sword and Cross. Cam tries again to make advances towards Luce, and comforts her over Todd's death, which she cannot help but feel partially responsible for. Daniel interrupts Cam and Luce, and takes her back to the lake area and the rock. Daniel expresses his feelings of anger towards Cam, and tells Luce that she deserves better than him. Back on the rock, Luce talks to Daniel about the Shadows she sees, which he is shocked by. A near-kiss between Luce and Daniel leaves Luce on her own at the rock again, as Daniel flees out of sight, leaving a purple haze behind him. This alarms Luce, but she dismisses it as something explainable.

Cam takes Luce on a date outside of the school grounds. However, when they enter the bar, they are set upon by drunken men. Cam easily defeats them, showing strength that is inhuman. Shortly after this, Daniel talks to Luce, explaining what is happening at the school, with the bizarre characters and almost supernatural occurrences. The majority of the people at the reform school are fallen angels; Gabbe (a beautiful girl who turns out to be the Angel Gabriel), Arriane and Annabelle (who initially passes herself off as Arriane's sister) are all on the side of God; whilst Cam, Roland (a black angel who is known for getting contraband) and Molly (a heavily pierced gothic girl) are under Satan's rule. Daniel has yet to choose a side. It is revealed that Daniel is cursed to love Luce. When he gets too close to her emotionally, she spontaneously combusts, dying before her eighteenth birthday. However, in this lifetime she has remained alive, despite him revealing this and despite a kiss that they share. It soon comes to light that Luce was not baptised in this lifetime, so if she dies, she will not be reincarnated.

A battle between the angels commences, and the school librarian, Miss Sophia, leads Luce and Penn (the only mortals) away from the battle. Once they are safe indoors, Miss Sophia reveals herself to be one of the 24 Elders of Zhsmaelim, a radical heavenly sect that is interested in finally tipping the balance between good and evil (by making Daniel choose a side). She hopes that with Luce dead and gone for good, Daniel would be forced to choose a side. She kills Penn with a dagger and attempts to do the same to Luce, but she is stopped in time by Daniel, Arriane and Gabbe. The battle outside is over, with no victor. Daniel informs Luce that she must be taken somewhere safe and entrusts her to Mr. Cole, one of the teachers at the school who knows about the fallen angels. Luce is transported away by an airplane after sharing one final kiss with Daniel, who promises that he will see her soon.

Main characters 
 Lucinda 'Luce' Price – Luce is the main protagonist of the novel. She began seeing "shadows" at a young age, these are revealed to be announcers and are "shadows of the past", something angels and demons are able to use to time travel. She is sent to Sword & Cross, a reform school, when a boy is killed in a fire, which she is blamed for starting. Upon her arrival at Sword & Cross she meets Daniel and Cam, both of whom she falls for. However, she is drawn to Daniel and feels as if she knows him from somewhere but what she discovers is beyond her imagination. Luce has actually been Daniel's lover in past lives but they are both cursed and every time Luce learns of her past and gets close to being with Daniel, she dies. She is friendly and beautiful and despite falling for Cam in the beginning, she realizes her love for Daniel is very powerful and strong as she has loved him for thousands of years. Due to the fact that her parents haven't had her baptized in her current incarnation, she's no longer able to re-incarnate, hence breaking the cycle.
 Daniel Grigori – Daniel is a fallen angel—a heavenly being who chose to side with neither God nor Satan at the beginning of time—instead he chose love. He is also Luce's romantic interest. He feigns disinterest in Luce, trying to ignore her for her own safety, due to a curse that has spanned since the beginning of time, but eventually gives in as he can't stay away from her. He is very secretive about Luce's past but it's mainly to do with the fact that he's scared that if she learns of it too quickly, she will die. He has watched her die many times and he doesn't want to lose her again. His love for Luce is very strong and he has a rocky friendship with Cam due to Cam trying to get Luce. He is supposedly the only Fallen Angel that has yet to choose a side and apparently, if he chooses one, the balance will tip as he was supposedly very high up on the throne in heaven.
 Cameron 'Cam' Briel – Cam is the antagonist of the story and Luce's other romantic interest. He is also a fallen angel—or Demon as he chose to side with Lucifer. He continuously tries to charm Luce and is antagonistic towards Daniel. In this book, he is portrayed as being evil, but we do learn that he has a more caring side to him. 
 Lucifer/Bill – A fallen angel, first appeared in the third book, he is later revealed to be Lucifer, the first angel and the former and first love of Lucinda .
 Arriane Alter – Arriane is a fallen angel. She befriends Luce on Luce's first day at Sword & Cross. She refers to herself as a psychopath. She chose to side with God.
 Pennyweather 'Penn' Van Syckle-Lockwood – One of Luce's friends. She is the daughter of the deceased groundskeeper. She is described as frumpy and unpopular, but her friendship proves to be a great asset, as she has access and knowledge about Sword & Cross and shares her expertise with Luce. She is later killed by Miss Sophia, the librarian. She is human and it is unknown if she found out about the Fallen Angels before she was killed.
 Gabrielle 'Gabbe' Givens – Gabbe is a very beautiful and graceful fallen angel at the school. Luce dislikes Gabbe at first because she believes that she is dating Daniel, though Gabbe is unerringly gracious towards her and is actually one of the few people telling Daniel to stop distancing himself from Luce. She has an angelic appearance and is described as having a southern accent. She chose to side with God.
 Roland Sparks – Roland, like the others, is a fallen angel. He is Daniel's friend at the school. He, like Cam and Molly, are considered "demons," fallen angels who side with Lucifer, which surprises Luce as he isn't like the other two. He is much nicer and doesn't seem at all 'evil'. He is able to smuggle anything into Sword & Cross but it is unknown how.
 Mary Margaret 'Molly' Zane – Molly is another fallen angel who stayed mostly on Lucifer's side. She is very aggressive and antagonistic towards most of the students at the reform school. She tries to warn Luce away from Daniel several times. It is unknown why she wants to separate the two, but it could be due to the fact that she wants Daniel to choose Lucifer's side to tip the scales, and Luce is his distraction.
 Sophia Bliss – Miss Sophia is the school's librarian. She appears to like Luce and Penn, considering them good students. She teaches the Religion and has very strong beliefs on the subject. It is later discovered that she is in fact one of the 24 Elders of Zhsmaelin, a radical heavenly sect, and has the highest position. She turns out to be evil. She kills Penn and tries to kill Luce too until Daniel, Arianne and Gabbe save her. Sophia escapes.
 Randy – Randy is an attendant at Sword & Cross. She is described as being very masculine. She is human and has no knowledge of the fallen angels at the school.
 Callie – Callie is Luce's best friend from Dover Prep School, where she attended as a scholarship student before being sent to Sword & Cross. She and Luce are very close and she tries to keep in contact with Luce as much as possible. She is human and also has no knowledge of the Fallen Angels.
 Todd Hammond – Todd is a student who arrived at Sword & Cross at the same time that Luce did. He dies of a broken neck while helping Luce out of a burning building.
 Trevor – Trevor was Luce's almost-boyfriend before she went to Sword & Cross but he burned in a fire when he kissed Luce and then Luce was sent to Sword & Cross as she was blamed for starting the fire. It is unknown how the fire actually started.
Other characters include Mr Cole, who is one of the teachers to actually know about the Fallen Angels at the school, Luce's parents (who are clueless about Luce's past lives) and Annabelle, Arianne's sister, another Fallen Angel who chose the side of God.

Legacy

Sequels
The series is six books long. The second book, Torment, was released on September 28, 2010. The third book, Passion, was released on June 14, 2011. The fourth book, Rapture, was released on June 12, 2012. Also released on January 24, 2012 was a side novel Fallen In Love which settles between the settings of Passion and Rapture. The sixth book, Unforgiven, was released on November 10, 2015. Original music was released to accompany the book.

Film version 

A film based on the novel, starring Addison Timlin, Jeremy Irvine, Harrison Gilbertson, and Joely Richardson, was released November 10, 2016.

TV series 
A TV series based on the novels begun principal photography in fall 2022. The adaptation stars Alexander Siddig, Sarah Niles, Jessica Alexander, Gijs Blom and Timothy Innes. It is set to be released on Brazilian streaming service Globoplay sometime in 2023.

References

External links
 The Official Fallen website
 Official Lauren Kate website
 Fallen at the Internet Movie Database

2009 American novels
American young adult novels
Young adult fantasy novels
Novels set in Savannah, Georgia
Angel novels
American fantasy novels adapted into films